New Albany Township may refer to the following places:

United States
New Albany Township, Floyd County, Indiana
New Albany Township, Story County, Iowa

See also
New Albany (disambiguation)

Township name disambiguation pages